Sister is the second studio album by British experimental rock trio Ultraísta. It was released on 13 March 2020 under Partisan Records. It was released immediately prior to the worldwide COVID-19 pandemic, leading to the album's promotional roll-out, touring, and subsequent interviews being affected.

Release 
The first single "Tin King" was released on 14 January 2020, with two more singles "Anybody" and "Harmony" following in the coming months. "Ordinary Boy" was released as a single in September of 2020 along with a remix EP following on 6 November. An additional extended play, Sister Remix EP, for the album released on 12 March 2021, featuring remixes from Zero 7, Grenda, Portico Quartet, Erland Cooper, and Harvey Causon.

A half-hour short film, entitled Sister, was directed by Nigel Godrich and released featuring the four singles from the album and lead singer Laura Bettinson walking throughout London, with cameos from Godrich and Joey Waronker.

Critical reception
Sister was met with generally favourable reviews from critics. At Metacritic, which assigns a weighted average rating out of 100 to reviews from mainstream publications, this release received an average score of 74, based on 5 reviews.

Track listing
All songs are written by Ultraísta.

Personnel 

 Laura Bettinson - vocals, synthesizer, songwriting
 Nigel Godrich - production, bass guitar, orchestration, synthesizer, songwriting
 Joey Waronker - drums, percussion, songwriting

Charts

References

2020 albums
Partisan Records albums
Ultraísta albums